Blastobasis insularis is a moth in the family Blastobasidae. It is found on the Canary Islands and Madeira.

References

Moths described in 1858
Blastobasis